The Montpelier Odd Fellows Hall is an Independent Order of Odd Fellows meeting hall located at 843 Washington St. in Montpelier, Idaho. The Renaissance Revival building was constructed in 1898–99. The stone building features round arch windows with fanlights on its second story. A pediment with the Odd Fellows' symbols projects above the building's cornice. As of 1978, the Odd Fellows still met in the building.

The building was listed on the National Register of Historic Places in 1978.

References

Clubhouses on the National Register of Historic Places in Idaho
Renaissance Revival architecture in Idaho
Cultural infrastructure completed in 1899
Buildings and structures in Bear Lake County, Idaho
Odd Fellows buildings in Idaho
1899 establishments in Idaho
National Register of Historic Places in Bear Lake County, Idaho